Hero's Honor (foaled  April 28, 1980) is an American Thoroughbred racehorse and the winner of the 1984 United Nations Handicap.

Career

Hero's Honor's first race was on April 30, 1983, at the Aqueduct, where he came in fifth. He picked up his first win in a Maiden Special Weight race at Belmont Park on May 21, 1983.

He went on a three race winstreak in September 1983, grabbing a trio of Allowance races at Belmont Park.

On September 29, 1983, in his fourth race that month, he came in 3rd place at the Grade-2 Rutger's Handicap.

He scored his biggest win up to that point by winning the May 7th, 1984, by winning the Grade-3 Fort Marcy Handicap.

He went on another three race win streak starting on June 2, 1984. He captured the Grade-2 Red Smith Handicap at Belmont Park. 15 days later, he won again at Belmont, this time grabbing a victory at the Grade-1 1984 Bowling Green Handicap. He finished his winstreak with another Grade-1 win, this time at the July 14th, 1984 United Nations Handicap, which was his third graded win in less than 6 weeks. This turned out to be his last victory.

Hero's Honor finished out the 1984 season with a 2nd and a 3rd place finish in September 1984 at Belmont Park, then retired after an October 13, 1984, 7th place finish at the Ballantine's Scotch Classic Handicap.

Stud career 

Pedigree descendants include:

c = colt, f = filly

Pedigree

References

1980 racehorse births
Thoroughbred family 1-x